Officer Down is a 2013 American action film directed by Brian A. Miller. Stephen Dorff plays a corrupt cop who seeks redemption.

Plot
While investigating a crime spree against young women, a police officer (Dorff) seeks redemption.

Cast
 Stephen Dorff as Detective David 'Cal' Callahan
 Dominic Purcell as Royce Walker
 David Boreanaz as Detective Les Scanlon
 Bree Michael Warner as Detective Brogan
 Brette Taylor as Assistant  District Attorney Loughlin
 AnnaLynne McCord as Zhanna Dronova
 Zoran Radanovich as Ivan Zavalon / Sergei Dronov
 Soulja Boy Tell 'Em as Rudy
 Jas Anderson as Ellis Dracut
 Stephen Lang as Lieutenant Jake LaRussa
 James Woods as Captain John Verona
 Elisabeth Röhm as Alexandra Callahan
 Walton Goggins as Detective Nick Logue / Angel
 Laura Harris as Ellen Logue
 Tommy Flanagan as Father Reddy
 Oleg Taktarov as Oleg Emelyanenko
 Johnny Messner as McAlister
 Kamaliya as Katya
 Bea Miller as Lanie Callahan
 Marisa Pierinias as Monica Logue
 A.K. Debris as James
 Misha Kuznetsov as Sergei Dronov

Development
The film was first announced on May 3, 2011. Filming began later that week in Connecticut. The film's screenplay was written by John Chase and it is directed by Brian A Miller. Locations where the movie was filmed include Roberto's Restaurant on State St, Fairfield Ave and inside a new apartment complex also located on Fairfield Ave, in Bridgeport CT. The first images from the set were revealed on May 6, 2011.

At the 2012 Cannes Film Festival, it was announced that the film would be distributed by Anchor Bay. The film's official poster was also revealed at the Cannes Film Festival.

Release
Anchor Bay gave it a limited release on January 18, 2013, and it grossed $1,463 in the US.

Reception
Mark Olsen of the Los Angeles Times called it "an overstuffed story that comes off not as layered but rather as an unfocused jumble".

References

External links
 Hitfix.com
 
 

2013 films
2013 action thriller films
2013 crime thriller films
2013 crime drama films
American crime drama films
2010s English-language films
2013 drama films
Films directed by Brian A. Miller
2010s American films